Cherokee Studios is a recording studio facility in Hollywood founded in 1972 by members of 1960s pop band The Robbs. Cherokee has been the location of many notable recordings by such artists as Steely Dan, David Bowie, Journey, The Cars, Foreigner, Tom Petty and the Heartbreakers, Devo, X, Mötley Crüe, "Weird Al" Yankovic, Dokken, John Mellencamp, Melissa Etheridge, The Replacements, The Lemonheads, Rollins Band, and Jimmy Eat World.

At the peak of its success, Cherokee operated eight studios in two locations. In his autobiography, Beatles producer George Martin dubbed Cherokee Studios the best studio in America.

History

Background 

The studio was founded by members of The Robbs, an American pop band from Oconomowoc, Wisconsin centered on three brothers who all adopted pseudonyms: Robert Donaldson ("Bruce Robb"), George Donaldson ("Joe Robb"), David Donaldson ("Dee Robb"), and family friend Craig Krampf ("Craig Robb"). Dick Clark discovered the band in 1962 when they were the opening act at the “Summer Caravan of Stars” in Wisconsin and invited them to continue on with the “Caravan” tour as essentially the house band. At the 1964 “Young World's Fair” in Chicago, the band won Clark's “Battle of the Bands”. The band was signed to Mercury Records in 1966, and moved to California to appear as regular performers on Clark's show Where the Action Is.

By 1969 the band, now signed to ABC/Dunhill, had changed their sound to a more country rock orientation and changed its name to Cherokee. ABC/Dunhill's studios were booked solid at the time, and the studio's chief technical engineer, Roger Nichols, was spending a lot of time at the band's ranch in rural Chatsworth. Nichols suggested the band buy some recording gear and set it up in the barn. Eventually, the band evolved from recording their own music to producing and engineering for other artists, including longtime friend Del Shannon and Steely Dan, who recorded overdubs for and mixed their 1974 album Pretzel Logic at "Cherokee's Ranch." The studio was even the location of the first demo recording by the Van Halen lineup of David Lee Roth, Eddie Van Halen, Alex Van Halen, and Michael Anthony. After being threatened to be evicted for running an "illegal home studio," the studio's owners began looking for a bigger facility.

Fairfax Avenue 
In January 1975, Cherokee purchased the former location of MGM Studios at 751 N. Fairfax Avenue in Hollywood, including its large 35 x 58 foot live room (known as "Frank Sinatra's string room") and five isolation booths. The brothers approached Trident Studios to build a custom 80-input A-Range mixing console - one of the first in the United States. Focused on making the recording studio a creative space designed for musicians and engineers, Cherokee's new studio featured five live rooms, 24-track mixing consoles, 24-hour session times, and a lounge bar, and quickly became one of the city's busiest studios, attracting such notable artists as David Bowie, Frank Sinatra, and Rod Stewart.

Cherokee's Fairfax Avenue location closed on August 31, 2007, with the last album recorded at that location being the Robert Bradley's Blackwater Surprise album Out of the Wilderness (2008). The studio closed to make way for a new building. Under the direction of a leading green developer, the site was to become the Lofts @ Cherokee Studios – a Green LEED Platinum Live/Work complex offering professional recording studios in select units designed by Cherokee owner Bruce Robb, but those plans did not come to fruition. The original developers went into foreclosure in 2008. New owners purchased the property and have had no contact or relationship with Bruce Robb and or Cherokee Studios.

Melrose Avenue 
In late August 2011, Cherokee Studio's website announced "New Studio Coming to Hollywood", and in 2020 Cherokee Studios opened a recording studio on Melrose Avenue across the street from Paramount Film Studios. Built in collaboration with George Augsberger and Bruce Robb, the new studio features Cherokee Studio's original Trident A-Range 48-channel, 24-bus, 24 monitor channel mixing console, as well as a large tracking space that can hold up to 40 string players comfortably. Of the new studio and location, it has been said the new location is a continuation of the Cherokee tradition while going above and beyond.

Prominent clients 
Under MGM Records 
Acts that recorded at M.G.M. Recording Studios include: Count Basie, Ella Fitzgerald, Judy Garland, Oscar Peterson, Lou Rawls, The Sylvers, Elvis Presley and the Nelson Riddle Orchestra.

Tom Petty
Petty recorded his third album Damn the Torpedoes and fourth Hard Promises at both Sound City Studios and Cherokee Studios respectively. During the recording of Hard Promises, John Lennon was scheduled to be in the recording studio at the same time as Petty and the Heartbreakers. However, the meeting never occurred due to the murder of Lennon in New York in December 1980. Both Damn the Torpedoes and Hard Promises were mixed at Cherokee Studios.

David Bowie
English musician David Bowie recorded his tenth studio album Station to Station at Cherokee in late 1975. Co-produced by Harry Maslin, it was released in January 1976 and was a massive commercial success.

Mötley Crüe
Mötley Crüe recorded the platinum selling albums Theatre of Pain and Shout at the Devil at Cherokee Studios. Technicians working on Shout at the Devil noted that the members of Mötley Crüe would "stay up for three days straight making music and not even think we were working hard, with girls were streaming in and out of the studio."

Harry Nilsson
Harry Nilsson recorded his final album Flash Harry at Cherokee Studios between 1978 and 1980. Produced by Steve Cropper and engineered by Bruce Robb, the album has a very clean, soulful sound and features a who's-who of collaborators including Ringo Starr, Paul Stallworth, Eric Idle and Mac Rebennack.

Bonnie Raitt
While living in one of the West Hollywood apartment complexes directly behind Cherokee Studios, Bonnie Raitt would pick up backup singing recording gigs with music producers Bruce Robb and Steve Cropper.

Frank Sinatra
Frank Sinatra recorded the Sinatra Christmas Album at Cherokee in 1975.

Ringo Starr
While he was recording Stop and Smell the Roses at Cherokee Studios in 1980, Ringo Starr invited George Harrison, Paul McCartney and Linda McCartney to guest on the album; Paul McCartney and Harrison also produced some of the tracks. Starr had approached John Lennon to help out as well, had received two demos of songs which eventually wound up on the posthumous Lennon album Milk and Honey, and reportedly, Lennon had agreed to come to Los Angeles in January 1981 and take part in the recording; the album then would have been a modest Beatles reunion. The assassination of Lennon prevented those plans from coming to fruition. Ronnie Wood of the Rolling Stones also collaborated with Starr on the album at Cherokee, adding guitar, bass, saxophone, keyboards, and back-up vocals.

Weird Al Yankovic
Weird Al Yankovic recorded his first album at Cherokee in 1982. The album sold over 500,000 copies.

Warren Zevon
In 2002, a terminally ill Warren Zevon came to Cherokee Studios to record what would be his final album, The Wind. Nick Read filmed Zevon's final recordings at Cherokee for the documentary,Warren Zevon: Keep Me In Your Heart. Bruce Springsteen joined Zevon at Cherokee for the single "Disorder in the House," Cherokee owner  Bruce Robb provided lead guitar on the first track of The Wind and support vocals on two other tracks.

Michael Jackson
Michael Jackson's 1979 album Off the Wall was recorded at Cherokee Studios. The album is among the best-selling albums of all time.

Other acts 
Acts that have recorded at Cherokee Studios include:
Aerosmith
Alice Cooper
Automatic 7
Barbra Streisand
Donny Osmond
Osmonds
Bliss 66
Buffalo Tom
The Cars
Chris DeMarco
Dave Matthews Band
David Bowie
Device
Devo
Diana Ross
Dokken
Donovan (Lady of the Stars)
Elis Regina
Fear
Charly García
The Go-Go's
Toto
Guns N' Roses
Sammy Hagar
Human Drama
Jean-Luc Ponty
JetSet
John Cougar Mellencamp
Journey
Lillian Axe
Korn
The Lemonheads
Lenny Kravitz
Lita Ford
Oingo Boingo
Olivia Newton-John
 Percy Sledge
Rod Stewart
Redbone
Renegade
Rollins Band
Steely Dan
Steppen Stones
Stryper
Stylus Automatic
Suicidal Tendencies
The Replacements (band)
 The Textones
 Taj Mahal
The Choirboys
Thirty Seconds to Mars
Van Halen
Vesuvius
Vinnie Vincent Invasion
WARRIOR
X
The Broken Homes
Radio Active Cats
Bihlman Bros

Film and TV
South Park
Shrek
The Doors
Twin Peaks
Twin Peaks: Fire Walk with Me
Good Morning America
The Last of the Mohicans
Three for the Road
The Three Musketeers
Dragnet
Sgt. Pepper's Lonely Hearts Club Band
Ocean's Twelve
Miami Vice
Boyz n the Hood
Uncle Buck
Blue Velvet
Ally McBeal
Casper
The Spooktacular New Adventures of Casper
21 Jump Street
Alien 3
Saturday Night Fever
Coyote Ugly 
Popeye
XXX
Fame
The Great Outdoors
Innerspace
Any Given Sunday
Sneakers
Menace II Society
Southland Tales
Village of the Damned
The Wiz
Young Guns II
Turner & Hooch
White Men Can't Jump
Twins
Earth Girls Are Easy
Vampires
Colors
The Larry Sanders Show
Pay It Forward
The Power of One
Ghosts of Mars
Masters of Horror
Don Juan DeMarco
Necessary Roughness
The Parkers
Boston Public
Crime Story
Air America 
Driven
Strong Medicine
Satisfaction
Neighbors
The Experts
Run Ronnie Run!
Cousins
Maid to Order
Give My Regards to Broad Street
Lackawanna Blues
Burglar
Down and Dirty Duck
The Idolmaker
Sphinx
Honky Tonk Freeway
Love N' Dancing
Mortuary Academy
Melanie
Guilty as Charged
All This and World War II
Crime Story
Masters of Horror

Selected gear list 
Studio 1 (1976)
Custom Trident A-Range Mixing Console with 80 Channels
Universal Audio 1176 Limiting Amplifier - 2
dbx 160x
GML 8200
Pultec EQ P1-A
Pultec MEQ-1
Ampex MM-1200 Series 24-Track Recorder
Ampex MM-Series 2-Track Mixdown Recorder
also
Studio 3 (1976)
MCI JH Series 24 Input Mixing Console
MCI JH Series 24-Track Recorder
MCI JH Series 2-Track Mixdown Recorder
BGW Power Amplifiers
Neumann U47, AKG C-414, AKG C-451, Shure SM-57 and SM-7 microphones
Sennheiser and AKG Stereo Headphones
EMT Echoplate Units
UREI & dbx Compressor/Limiters plus Various Additional Outboard Gear and Musical Instruments, i.e. Electric Guitars & Synthesizer Keyboards

References

External links

Mixonline.com article
REthink Development, official website for Lofts @ Cherokee Studios
THE RECORD @ Cherokee Studios, Lofts @ Cherokee Studios official blog
A Conversation with Bruce Robb on the Conversion of Cherokee Studios into Lofts

Recording studios in California
Music of Los Angeles
Culture of Hollywood, Los Angeles
1972 establishments in California